MBK Mariupol (former name: BK Azovmash)is a Ukrainian professional basketball club. It was founded in 1990 in the city of Mariupol in South-Eastern Ukraine.

Mariupol was one of the strongest teams in Ukraine along with Kyiv, Khimik and,  Cherkasy. The team's performance peak was an appearance in the EuroCup Final of 2007, against Akasvayu Girona.

History
The club was founded in 1990. Azovmash moved up from the Ukrainian third to first division by 1999. Azovmash won the 2002 Ukrainian SuperLeague title. Azovmash added another Ukrainian title in 2004 and following the arrival of point guard Khalid El-Amin, won the domestic championship again in 2006 and 2007.

In 2007, with players like Kenan Bajramović, Panagiotis Liadelis, Serhiy Lishchuk and El-Amin, Azovmash reached the FIBA EuroCup Final Four, defeating Italian Serie A club Virtus Bologna by a point in the semis before falling to Spanish Liga ACB club Akasvayu Girona in the title game. In 2008, Azovmash reached the elimination rounds ULEB Cup and won the Ukrainian domestic championship and cup.

After leaving the Ukrainian Basketball Superleague in 2014, the club did not join any competition until 2016, when the club joined the Higher League, the Ukrainian second division.

Season by season

Honours
 Ukrainian SuperLeague:
 Gold - 2003, 2004, 2006, 2007, 2008, 2009, 2010
 Silver - 2005, 2012, 2013
 Bronze - 2001, 2002
 Ukrainian Cup:
 Gold - 2001, 2002, 2006, 2008, 2009
 Silver - 2007
 FIBA EuroCup:
 Gold Conference North - 2003
 Finalist of the EuroCup 2006-07

Notable players

  Oleksandr Rayevsky
  Serhiy Lishchuk
  Alexander Lokhmanchuk
  Kyrylo Fesenko
  Maksym Pustozvonov
  Denys Lukashov
  Vyacheslav Bobrov
  Ihor Zaytsev
  Denys Lukashov
  Oleksandr Kol'čenko
  Thomas Van Den Spiegel
  Kenan Bajramović
  Nemanja Gordić
  Ratko Varda
  Slaven Rimac
  Robert Archibald
  Panagiotis Liadelis
  Nikola Radulović
  Sandis Valters
  Tomas Delininkaitis
  Simonas Serapinas
  Vladimir Golubović
  Aleksandar Ćapin
  Radoslav Rancik
  Miroslav Raduljica
  Ivan Paunić
  William Avery
  Rodney Buford
  R. T. Guinn
  Tyus Edney
  Khalid El-Amin
  Junior Harrington
  Jermaine Jackson
  Kris Lang
  Carlos Powell
  Marc Salyers
  Dijon Thompson
  Joe Crispin

Head coaches
  Andriy Podkovyrov (2002–2004)
  Rimas Girskis (2004–2007)
  Algirdas Brazys (2007–Dec. 2007)
  Sergiy Zavalin (Dec. 2007–Feb. 2008 )
  Memi Bečirovič (Feb.–Nov. 2008)
  Rimas Girskis (Nov. 2008– Nov. 2009)
  Andriy Podkovyrov (Nov. 2009–Feb. 2010)
  Sergiy Zavalin (Feb.–Nov. 2010)
  Rolandas Jarutis (Nov. 2010–Jun. 2011 )
  Aleksandar Petrović (Jun.–Dec. 2011)
  Gintaras Krapikas (Dec. 2011–Feb. 2012)
  Luca Bechi (Feb.–Jun. 2012)
  Aleksandar Kesar (Jul.–Nov. 2012)
  Sergiy Zavalin (Nov. 2012)
  Sergiy Zavalin (Jun. 2013–Jan. 2014)
  Zvezdan Mitrović (Jan.–May 2014)

References

External links
Official Site 
Official English Site
Eurocup Team Profile
Eurobasket.com Team Profile
Official Fan Club 

Basketball teams in Ukraine
Basketball teams in the Soviet Union
Sport in Mariupol
Basketball teams established in 1990
1990 establishments in Ukraine